Sciota Township is located in McDonough County, Illinois. As of the 2010 census, its population was 539 and it contained 248 housing units. The village of Sciota is located in Sciota Township.

Geography

Demographics

References

External links
City-data.com

Townships in McDonough County, Illinois
Townships in Illinois